Xiangxue Pharmaceutical Co., Ltd. also known as XPH, is a Chinese pharmaceutical company. It was headquartered in Guangzhou Economic and Technological Development Zone, Guangzhou, the capital of the Guangdong Province. The company started in a place that near to the tourist spot  (now in the Luogang Subdistrict, Huangpu District), thus called itself Xiangxue.

Xiangxue Pharmaceutical was a constituent of SZSE 200 Index (mid-cap index), but was removed in January 2017; it was inserted to SZSE 700 Index (small-cap index) instead at the same time. SZSE 200, 300 and 700 Indexes are subsets of SZSE 1000 Index, the latter is a stock market index for the top 1,000 companies by free-float adjusted capitalization. In July 2017 Xiangxue was also removed from SZSE Component Index, an index for top 500 companies of the exchange.

History
Xiangxue Pharmaceutical became a "company limited by shares" on 29 December 1997 (roughly equivalent to public limited company); its shares were traded in ChiNext board of Shenzhen Stock Exchange since 2010.

Products
 "Asia" brand soft drinks (licensed from an investment vehicle of the Guangzhou government)
 "Eisiti" Herbal Tea (discontinued? )
 Jochi brand health supplement

According to 2016 Annual Report, manufacturing and trading medicine accounted for 29.60% and 26.45% of its revenue, with an additional 32.94% from Chinese medicine; soft drinks accounted for 4.91%, it was followed by medical equipment and other revenue.

Eisiti was a competitor of Wong Lo Kat which was produced by Guangzhou Pharmaceuticals and Jiaduobao. The production of Eisiti was suspended in 2011, according to news report, despite the company denial.

Subsidiaries

 
 
 Xiangxue Asian Beverage (63%)
 Jochi
  (55%)

 
 
 Chongqing Xiangxue Yiyao
 Guangdong Xiangxue

Equity investment

 Charmacy Pharmaceutical

Sponsorship

Xiangxue Pharmaceutical was a sponsor of Guangzhou F.C. from 2002 to 2003 season. As of 2017, it was owned by Evergrande Group, a property developer and Alibaba Group, parent company of taobao.com, and the club was known as Guangzhou Evergrande Taobao F.C..

Xiangxue Pharmaceutical also sponsored , another youth football team that based Zhaoqing, Guangdong Province to play in Hong Kong First Division League, the professional league of Hong Kong S.A.R., China (across the border of the Guangdong Province) as Xiangxue Pharmaceutical for 2001–02 season. It was replaced by the reserve team of Guangzhou F.C. in 2002–03 season and 2003–04 season. In 2004–05 season, Xiangxue Pharmaceutical was the sponsor name of two different teams, that not related to Guangzhou F.C. and Zhaoqing-based club.

Xiangxue Pharmaceutical also sponsored Hong Kong football club Sun Hei SC from 2005–06 to 2006–07 season, as well as Chinese football club Shenzhen F.C. in 2007 and 2008 season. Which the club was known as Shenzhen Xiangxue Eisiti (Shenzhen Xiangxue Shangqingyin) at that time; Guangzhou F.C. was owned by Xiangxue Pharmaceutical's competitor Guangzhou Pharmaceuticals from 2005 to 2009.

Shenzhen F.C. II, the B team of Shenzhen F.C., was also played in Hong Kong as Xiangxue Eisiti in 2008–09 season.

Xiangxue Pharmaceutical also secured the naming rights of 2003–04 Hong Kong First Division League and 2008–09 Hong Kong Senior Challenge Shield.

Shareholders
, two investment vehicles of Chen Shumei and Wang Yonghui, owned 36.98% shares of the company as the largest shareholder. According to the company, they were a couple, and Ms. Chen owned most of the stake in their investment vehicles. Part of the shares they owned were pledged. Ms. Chen ceased as the director of the company on 25 May 2016.

It was followed by two investment accounts of the National Social Security Fund for a total of 4.09%, a civilian-owned water supply company from Luogang, Guangzhou for 4.06%, Central Huijin Investment for 1.51% and some private equity funds that were managed by the banks.

Footnotes

References

External links
   

Pharmaceutical companies of China
Drink companies of China
Companies listed on the Shenzhen Stock Exchange
Companies based in Guangzhou
Civilian-run enterprises of China
Chinese companies established in 1986
Pharmaceutical companies established in 1986